The 1979 All-Ireland Senior Ladies' Football Championship Final was the sixth All-Ireland Final and the deciding match of the 1979 All-Ireland Senior Ladies' Football Championship, an inter-county ladies' Gaelic football tournament for the top teams in Ireland.

Offaly were the winners after a replay.
The replay was held at McCann Park in Portarlington.

References

Ladies
All-Ireland Senior Ladies' Football Championship Finals
Offaly county ladies' football team matches
Tipperary county ladies' football team matches